Marlene Nourbese Philip (born 3 February 1947), usually credited as M. NourbeSe Philip, is a Canadian poet, novelist, playwright, essayist and short story writer.

Life and works
Born in the Caribbean in Woodlands, Moriah, Trinidad and Tobago, Philip was educated at the University of the West Indies. She subsequently pursued graduate degrees in political science and law at the University of Western Ontario, and practised law in Toronto, Ontario, for seven years. She left her law practice in 1983 to devote time to her writing.

Philip is known for experimentation with literary form and for her commitment to social justice.
 
Philip has published five books of poetry, two novels, four books of collected essays and two plays. Her short stories, essays, reviews and articles have appeared in magazines and journals in North America and England and her poetry has been extensively anthologized. Her work – poetry, fiction and non-fiction – is taught widely at university level and is the subject of much academic writing and critique.
 
Her first novel, Harriet's Daughter (1988), is widely used in high-school curricula in Ontario, Great Britain and was, for a decade, studied by all children in the Caribbean receiving a high school CXC diploma. It has also been published as an audio cassette, a script for stage and in a German-language edition. Although categorized as young adult literature, Harriet's Daughter is a book that can appeal to older children and adults of all ages. Set in Toronto, this novel explores the themes of friendship, self-image, ethics and migration, while telling a story that is riveting, funny and technically accomplished. It makes the fact of being Black a very positive and enhancing experience.

Philip's most renowned poetry book, She Tries Her Tongue, Her Silence Softly Breaks, was awarded the Casa de las Américas Prize for Literature while still in manuscript form. As she explores themes of race, place, gender, colonialism and, always, language, Philip plays with words, bending and restating them in a way that is reminiscent of jazz. The tension between father tongue (the white Euro-Christian male canon), and mother tongue (Black African female) is always present. Most quoted is the chant-like refrain at the core of Discourse on the Logic of Language: 

Philip is a prolific essayist. Her articles and essays ... demonstrate a persistent critique and an impassioned concern for issues of social justice and equity in the arts, prompting Selwyn R. Cudjoe's assertion that Philip "serves as a lightning rod of black cultural defiance of the Canadian mainstream." More to the point is the epigram in Frontiers where Philip dedicates the book to Canada, "in the effort of becoming a space of true belonging".

It is as an essayist that M. NourbeSe Philip's role as anti-racist activist is most evident. She was one of the first to make culture her primary focus as she argued passionately and articulately for social justice and equity. Specific controversial events that have been the focus of her essays include the Into the Heart of Africa exhibit at the Royal Ontario Museum, the Toronto production of Show Boat, and Caribana. Her essays also put the spotlight on racial representation on arts councils and committees in Canada and there have been definite advances in this area subsequently. It was at a small demonstration concerning the lack of Canadian writers of colour outside of the 1989 PEN Canada gala that she was confronted by June Callwood.

Philip has also taught at the University of Toronto, taught creative fiction at the third-year level at York University and has been writer in residence at McMaster University and University of Windsor.
 
Her 2008 work Zong! is based on a legal decision at the end of the 18th century, related to the notorious murder of Africans on board the British slave ship of that name. A dramatized reading of this new poem cycle was workshopped and presented at Harbourfront in Toronto as part of rock.paper.sistahz in 2006. Poems from this collection have been published in Facture, boundary 2 and Fascicle; the later includes four poems, along with an extensive introduction. On 16 April 2012, at b current studio space in Toronto, Philip held her first authorial full-length reading of Zong!—an innovative interaction-piece lasting seven hours, in which both author and audience performed a cacophonous collective reading of the work from beginning to end. In solidarity with this collective reading, another audience-performance was held in Blomfontein, South Africa.

In talking about her own work Philip has said, "fiction is about telling lies, but you must be scathingly honest in telling those lies. Poetry is about truth telling, but you need the lie – the artifice of the form to tell those truths."

Her writing has featured in many anthologies, including  International Feminist Fiction (edited by Julia Penelope and Sarah Valentine, 1992), Daughters of Africa (edited by Margaret Busby, 1992), Oxford Book of Stories by Canadian Women in English (edited by Rosemary Sullivan, 2000), among others.

Bibliography

Poetry
 Thorns (1980)
 Salmon Courage (1983)
 She Tries Her Tongue, Her Silence Softly Breaks (1989)
 Discourse on the Logic of Language (1989)
 Zong! (2008)

Novels
 Harriet's Daughter (1988)
 Harriet und schwarz wie ich. Transl. Nina Schindler. Anrich, Kevelaer 1993 (in German)
 Looking for Livingstone: An Odyssey of Silence (1991)

Essays
 Frontiers: Essays and Writings on Racism and Culture (1992)
 Showing Grit: Showboating North of the 44th Parallel (1993)
 CARIBANA: African Roots and Continuities - Race, Space and the Poetics of Moving (1996)
 Genealogy of Resistance and Other Essays (1997)
 Bla_k: Essays and Interviews (2017)

Drama
 Coups and Calypsos (1999)
 Harriet's Daughter (2000)

Awards
Casa de las Americas prize for the manuscript version of the poetry book, She Tries Her Tongue... 1998
Tradewinds Collective (Trinidad & Tobago) Poetry – 1st prize, 1988 and Short Story – 1st prize, 1988
Canadian Library Association prize for children's literature, runner-up, for Harriet's Daughter - 1989
Max and Greta Abel Award for Multicultural Literature, first runner-up for Harriet's Daughter - 1989
Guggenheim Fellow, in poetry – 1990
MacDowell Fellow – 1991
Lawrence Foundation Award for the short story "Stop Frame" published in the journal Prairie Schooner - 1995
Toronto Arts Award in writing and publishing, finalist – 1995
Rebels for a Cause award, the Elizabeth Fry Society of Toronto – 2001
Woman of Distinction award in the Arts, YWCA - 2001
Chalmers Fellowship in Poetry – 2002
Rockefeller Foundation residency in Bellagio, Italy - 2005
PEN/Nabokov Award for International Literature - 2020
Molson Prize - 2021

References
Who's Who in Canadian Literature. Toronto: Reference Press, 1997–98.
Microsoft Encarta Africana, 2001.
Black Heritage Month, poster, 2002.
Dawn P. Williams, Who's Who in Black Canada, Toronto: D. P. Williams, 2003.

Notes

External links
 M. NourbeSe Philip website
 PennSound audio
 "The journey of the word" - interview, UWI Today, March 2010.

20th-century Canadian novelists
20th-century Canadian poets
21st-century Canadian poets
Canadian women poets
Canadian women novelists
Canadian women dramatists and playwrights
Trinidad and Tobago poets
Black Canadian writers
Trinidad and Tobago emigrants to Canada
Living people
Writers from Toronto
1947 births
University of the West Indies alumni
University of Western Ontario alumni
Trinidad and Tobago women poets
20th-century Canadian dramatists and playwrights
21st-century Canadian dramatists and playwrights
Canadian women short story writers
20th-century Canadian women writers
21st-century Canadian women writers
Trinidad and Tobago novelists
20th-century Canadian short story writers
Black Canadian women
21st-century Canadian short story writers
Trinidad and Tobago women novelists
PEN/Nabokov Award winners